The Jefferson City Schools is a public school district in Jackson County, Georgia, United States, based in Jefferson. It serves Jefferson and the surrounding communities in Jackson County.

Schools
The Jefferson City School District has two elementary schools, one middle school, and one high school.

Elementary schools
Jefferson Academy
Jefferson Elementary School

Middle school
Jefferson Middle School

High school
Jefferson High School

COVID-19 Pandemic
In the summer of 2020, Jefferson City Schools made national headlines as one of the first school districts in the United States (and the first in Georgia) to resume in-person classes during the COVID-19 pandemic.

References

External links

School districts in Georgia (U.S. state)
Education in Jackson County, Georgia